Vernon John Schuppan  (born 19 March 1943) is a retired Australian motor racing driver. Schuppan drove in various categories, participating in Formula One, the Indianapolis 500 and most successfully in sports car racing.

Although he considers himself to be a single-seater driver, Schuppan's biggest career victory was with the factory-backed Rothmans Porsche team when he partnered Americans Hurley Haywood and Al Holbert to win the 1983 24 Hours of Le Mans driving the Porsche 956.

In 1984 he was made a Member of the Order of Australia for "service to the sport of motor racing".

Early career and Formula One
After a successful karting career in which he won numerous Australian state and national titles, Schuppan made the decision to pursue a career in motor racing. He and his wife Jennifer ventured to Great Britain (with a self-imposed 2-year limit of making it big) to allow him to participate in the British Formula Atlantic Championship, which he won, leading to a test with BRM. As BRM's test driver he qualified for the 1972 Belgian Grand Prix at Nivelles-Baulers, but he did not start the race because teammate Helmut Marko commandeered his car, though he did compete in some non-championship races with BRM.

In 1974 Schuppan went to Team Ensign, débuting again in the Belgian Grand Prix where he finished in 15th position. In Monaco he retired on lap four because of an accident. Schuppan was disqualified in both Sweden and the Netherlands; in Sweden because he started illegally from 26th place on the grid and in the Netherlands for receiving a tyre change outside of the pits. Schuppan failed to qualify in France or Britain. He retired in Germany on lap four because of gearbox problems.

In 1975 he raced in one race in Sweden for Embassy Racing With Graham Hill team, retiring from the race with transmission problems. In 1977 Schuppan raced for Surtees, finishing 12th in Britain and a career best seventh in Germany. He finished 16th in Austria, but failed to qualify for his final Formula One race in the Netherlands. Schuppan would later describe Surtees team boss,  World Champion John Surtees, as an autocratic owner who "always knew best and wouldn't listen to his drivers" and believes his time with the team was hampered by not being given equal equipment to his teammate Vittorio Brambilla.

Sports cars
Schuppan has had a very successful sports car career, winning the 1983 24 Hours of Le Mans for Porsche's official factory team with Al Holbert and Hurley Haywood in a Rothmans Porsche 956 (#3). Holbert drove the final lap of the race with an overheating (and steaming) engine caused by an airflow blockage to the radiator that cooled the heads, it seized as he crossed the finish line. The second placed car, the #1 Rothmans Porsche of defending winners Jacky Ickx and Derek Bell (driving) was only 17 seconds behind their teammates at the end of 24 hours of racing.

By winning Le Mans in 1983, Schuppan became only the second Australian to win the French classic, following in the footsteps of 1928 winner Bernard Rubin. Although Rubin was born in Australia, Schuppan is often mistaken for being the first Aussie winner.

Schuppan also finished second at Le Mans in 1977 driving a Mirage GR8-Renault turbo with French F1 driver Jean-Pierre Jarier, and second in 1982 in a Rothmans Porsche 956 with Jochen Mass. He also finished third in 1975 with Jean-Pierre Jaussaud in a Mirage GR8-Ford Cosworth DFV.

After winning at Le Mans, Schuppan went on to win the 1983 Japanese Sports-Prototype Championship.

He finished sixth at the 1984 24 Hours of Le Mans driving with Jarier and fellow Australian,  World Champion Alan Jones making his Le Mans début (and indeed his only start), in a Kremer Racing Porsche 956B after the factory backed Rothmans team boycotted the event over the Automobile Club de l'Ouest's new fuel restriction rules. Initially Porsche were not going to release their drivers for the race, but finally relented less than two weeks before the race and Manfred and Erwin Kremer were more than happy for the defending race winner to join them. Schuppan and Jones fought for the lead in the first few hours of the race with the Lancia LC2 of Bob Wollek and Alessandro Nannini, until the nose of the 956 was damaged by a spinning Roger Dorchy at Mulsanne Corner, losing the team a few laps in repairs. The Kenwood sponsored 956 fought back to be again fighting for the lead, and near the end of the race Jarier was 2 laps down but catching the leading Joest Racing Porsche driven by Klaus Ludwig and Henri Pescarolo (the eventual winners) by over 10 seconds per lap. He then pitted for Schuppan to run the car to the flag. Schuppan got in only one and a half laps before the car broke a conrod with just 90 minutes left to run. As Automobile Club de l'Ouest rules state that for a car to be classified as a finisher it must finish the last lap within a certain time, Schuppan fired up the Porsche and headed out for one last lap and a 6th-place finish.

He had a number of other podium finishes in the World Sports Car Championship, including second in the 1973 and 1982 Spa 1000 km, third in the 1983 and 1984 Fuji 1000 km and third in the 1985 Selangor 800 km race. Schuppan also placed third in the All Japan Sports Prototype Championship in 1984, 1985 and 1986.

Other categories
Schuppan competed in three Indianapolis 500 races. These were 1976 (where he won the Rookie of the Year award), 1979 and 1981, with a best result of third in 1981 driving a McLaren-Ford. In all, he started 32 CART and USAC Championship races. He won the 1974 and 1976 Macau Grand Prix races, dominating the 1974 race, winning by four laps.

He also won the 1971 British Formula Atlantic Championship and the Singapore Grand Prix in 1973. He was second in 1972 and also second in the Malaysian Grand Prix in 1972. He raced Formula 5000 in Europe between 1974 and 1975 and in North America 1974-1976 with some success.

In his home country Australia, Schuppan won the 1976 Rothmans International Series run for Formula 5000 cars, driving a Lola T332-Chevrolet. He placed second in the 1976 Australian Grand Prix at Sandown Park in Melbourne driving an Elfin MR8 Chevrolet, only half a second behind winner John Goss in a Matich A53-Repco Holden. He was also runner up in the 1978 Rothmans International Series, driving an Elfin MR8-Chevrolet for fellow South Australian Garrie Cooper, the owner and founder of Elfin Sports Cars and his factory run Ansett Team Elfin.

When Schuppan was regularly returning home to Australia to race he was also a popular choice as a co-driver for top touring car teams such as Allan Moffat Racing, Dick Johnson Racing and the Peter Brock run Holden Dealer Team in the Sandown 400 and Bathurst 1000 races in the late 1970s and early 1980s. His best finish at Bathurst was a fifth place with Dick Johnson in 1978 driving a Ford XC Falcon. He drove for the Holden Dealer Team in 1981, partnering John Harvey in a Holden VC Commodore to 4th place in the Hang Ten 400 after starting the race, but never got to drive the car at Bathurst after a broken front wheel sent Harvey into the guardrail and retirement on lap 37.

Allan Moffat and Schuppan started on pole and were leading the 1976 Hardie-Ferodo 1000 when their XB Falcon GT Hardtop retired with engine failure in lap 87. In a 2013 interview with "Australian Muscle Car" magazine Schuppan told that Moffat's Falcon was the best touring car he ever drove.

Other activities

With Japanese backing, Schuppan produced minimally modified street legal 962 race cars. The first, known as the 962R and registered in the UK as H726 LDP, retained the original bodywork and honeycomb chassis from its racing career. Later a road going evolution of the Porsche 962 called the Schuppan 962CR was developed, using different bodywork than the 962R. At the then price of 195 million yen (US$1.5 million) only six were built.

Failure of payment for two of the cars shipped to Japan coupled with the high cost of the car's construction and worldwide economic recession, forced Schuppan to declare bankruptcy. Schuppan then also co-owned an Indy Lights team with Stefan Johansson, the pair managed the career of New Zealand born driver Scott Dixon until Schuppan and Johansson had a falling out resulting in Schuppan leaving the partnership.

In May 2006, Schuppan was elected into the Club International des Anciens Pilotes de Grand Prix F1, an eminent organisation based in Monaco.

Schuppan also played an important role in bringing Formula One to the city of Adelaide in his home state of South Australia. F1 boss Bernie Ecclestone had originally favoured the Australian Grand Prix to be held in Sydney. However, the Premier of South Australia, John Bannon, asked Schuppan (who knew Ecclestone personally) to come and take a look at Adelaide. Ultimately Ecclestone was so impressed the Grand Prix was held in Adelaide for eleven years from 1985 to 1995.

As of 2014, Schuppan lives in Adelaide with Jennifer, his wife of over 45 years. The couple live in a converted warehouse adjacent to the Adelaide Street Circuit which hosted the Australian Grand Prix and currently hosts the Clipsal 500 on a modified version of the circuit for V8 Supercars. Despite his over 40 years of international motorsport, Schuppan describes living in a city as a new experience. He is also a regular supporter of the Targa Adelaide tarmac rally.

Racing record

Complete Formula One World Championship results
(key)

Non-Championship Formula One results
(key)

Complete European Formula Two Championship results
(key)

Complete European F5000 Championship results
(key) (Races in bold indicate pole position; races in italics indicate fastest lap)

American open-wheel racing
(key) (Races in bold indicate pole position)

USAC Championship Car

PPG Indycar Series

Indianapolis 500

Complete 24 Hours of Le Mans results

Complete Bathurst 1000 results

Complete British Saloon Car Championship results
(key) (Races in bold indicate pole position; races in italics indicate fastest lap.)

References

 Driver Database stats
 Racing Reference Profile
 Champcar Stats
 My F5000 Profile

1943 births
24 Hours of Le Mans drivers
24 Hours of Le Mans winning drivers
Australian Formula One drivers
Australian IndyCar Series drivers
BRM Formula One drivers
Ensign Formula One drivers
Surtees Formula One drivers
Hill Formula One drivers
British Touring Car Championship drivers
Champ Car drivers
Indianapolis 500 drivers
Indianapolis 500 Rookies of the Year
Living people
People from Whyalla
Racing drivers from South Australia
World Sportscar Championship drivers
Members of the Order of Australia
Long Distance Series drivers
Japanese Sportscar Championship drivers
Porsche Motorsports drivers
Team Joest drivers